Westgarthtown is a heritage registered precinct located within the Melbourne suburbs of Thomastown and Lalor, in Victoria, Australia.

History
The town was originally known as Neu Mecklenburg, and was established around 1850. The name was changed to Westgarthtown in honour of William Westgarth, who sponsored German immigration. The name was still in use up until the First World War, when it became officially regarded as part of Thomastown.

Modern day
In the 1970s, urban sprawl caught up with the village, and though it is now surrounded by suburban housing, the village is protected by the Victorian Heritage Act.

Significant remaining buildings include:

 The Lutheran Church (1856)
 Westgarthtown Cemetery (1850)
Ziebell's Farmhouse
Graff's Farmhouse (1873)
 Siebel's Farmhouse (1860)
 Maltzahn's Farmhouse
Wuchatsch's Farmhouse

The four farmhousesare listed on the Victorian Heritage Register.

In 2018, Friends of Westgarthtown successfully completed the Museum Accreditation Program. This is a gold-standard program which promotes best practice across all areas of museum management in line with the National Standards for Museums and Galleries.

Books on Westgarthtown 
Jones, Michael Nature's Plenty: a history of the City of Whittlesea, Sydney, N.S.W. Allen & Unwin, 1992 

Wuchatsch, Robert Westgarthtown, the German settlement at Thomastown, 1985

See also
 Germantown, Victoria - located near Geelong
 Australian place names changed from German names

References

Heritage sites in Melbourne